Aldo Romano (born 16 January 1941) is an Italian jazz drummer. He also founded a rock group in 1971.

Biography
He was born in Belluno, Italy. Romano moved to France as a child and by the 1950s he was playing guitar and drums professionally in Paris, but he first gained attention when he started working with Don Cherry in 1963. He recorded with Steve Lacy, and would go on to tour with Dexter Gordon among others. In the 1970s, he moved into rock-influenced forms of jazz fusion and, in 1978, made his first album as a leader. In the 1980s, he returned to his earlier style for several albums. Although he has lived most of his life in France, he has retained an affection for Italy and has set up a quartet of Italian jazz musicians. Romano also played a role in starting the career of French pianist, Michel Petrucciani. In 2004 he won the Jazzpar Prize.

Discography
 Divieto Di Santificazione with Jean-Francois Jenny-Clark (Horo, 1977)
 Il Piacere (Owl, 1979)
 Night Diary (Owl, 1980) 
 Alma Latina (Owl, 1983) 
 Ritual (Owl, 1988)
 Eric Barret/Aldo Romano/Henri Texier (Carlyne Music, 1988) 
 To Be Ornette to Be (Owl, 1989) 
 Ten Tales with Joe Lovano (Owl 1990) 
 Dreams & Waters (Owl, 1991) 
 Yesterday's Tomorrow with Ron McClure, John Abercrombie (European Music Productions, 1991)
 Non Dimenticar (PolyGram, 1993) 
 Prosodie (Verve, 1995)
 Intervista (Verve, 1997) 
 Because of Bechet (EmArcy/Universal 2002)
 Threesome (Universal 2004) 
 The Jazzpar Prize (Enja 2004) 
 Corners (Label Bleu 2005) 
 Chante (Dreyfus 2005)
 Flower Power (Naive, 2006) 
 Etat De Fait (Dreyfus, 2007) 
 Just Jazz (Dreyfus, 2008)
 Complete Communion to Don Cherry (Dreyfus, 2010) 
 Desireless (Musica, 2010) 
 Origine (Dreyfus 2010)
 Inner Smile (Dreyfuss, 2011)
 Plays the Connection (Dreyfus, 2013)
 Liberi Sumus (Le Triton, 2014)
 Melodies En Noir & Blanc (Le Triton, 2017)
 La Belle Vie (Sunset, 2019)

As sideman
With Gordon Beck
 Sunbird (JMS-Cream, 1979)
With Philip Catherine Trio
 Transparence (1986)
With Don Cherry
 Togetherness (Durium, 1965)
 Live at Cafe Montmartre 1966 (3 volumes) (ESP-Disk, 1966)
With Paolo Damiani
 Poor Memory (Splasc(h), 1987)
With Michel Graillier
 Dream Drops (Owl, 1982)
With Franz Koglmann and Bill Dixon
 Opium for Franz (Pipe, 1977) – recorded in 1976; 3 tracks reissued on Opium (Between the Lines, 2001)
With Rolf Kühn and Joachim Kühn
 Impressions of New York (Impulse!, 1967)
With Steve Kuhn, Miroslav Vitous
 Oceans in the Sky (Owl, 1990)
With Steve Lacy
 Jazz Realities (Fontana, 1966)
 Disposability (RCA [Italy], 1966)
 Sortie (GTA, 1966)
 Epistophy (BYG Actuel, 1969)
With Michel Petrucciani
 Flash (Bingow, 1980)
 Michel Petrucciani (Owl, 1981)
 Estate (IRD, 1982)
 Playground (Blue Note, 1991)
With Enrico Rava
 Enrico Rava Quartet (ECM, 1978)
With Louis Sclavis, Henri Texier, and Guy Le Querrec
 Carnet de Routes (Label Bleu, 1995) 
 Suite Africaine (Label Bleu, 1999) 
 African Flashback (Label Bleu, 2005)

References

External links
[ AllMusic]

1941 births
Living people
Italian emigrants to France
Italian jazz drummers
Male drummers
Enja Records artists
Male jazz musicians
Label Bleu artists
PolyGram artists
Naïve Records artists
Verve Records artists